Rebel Child may refer to:
 Rebel Child, a 2014 album by Blackjack Billy
 Rebel Child, a 2017 album by Tenille Arts (or the title track of this album)
 The Rebel Child, a 1984 rock opera by Alan Simon
 "Rebel Child", a song from Gretchen Wilson's 2005 album, All Jacked Up
 Rebel Child, a 2013 novel by Jaye Wells (under the pen name Kate Eden)
 Rebel Child Productions, an independent film production company co-founded by Amir Mann